Hugh Beazley may refer to:

 Hugh Loveday Beazley (1880–1964), English judge
 Hugh John Beazley (1916–2011), his son, Royal Air Force fighter pilot